The Gibraltar Rugby Football Union is the governing body for rugby in Gibraltar. It oversees the development of the sport in the territory.

Europa Sports Park is where Gibraltar Rugby host all of their Gibraltar national rugby union team home games, as well as the training and match base for the four Gibraltar Rugby Football Union clubs: Ibex Buccaneers, the Rock Scorpions, the Straits Sharks and Europa Stormers who all play in the u-mee Gibraltar Rugby Championship. The recent addition of the Trusted Novus bank Youth rugby festival also increases the rugby offer for young people on the rock.

See also
Rugby union in Gibraltar
Gibraltar national rugby union team

External links
Gibraltar Rugby Football Union

Rugby union in Gibraltar
Rugby union governing bodies in Europe
Sports organizations established in 1945